This article details the North Wales Crusaders Rugby League Football Club's 2013 season. This is the club's second season after reforming following the former Super League club Crusaders Rugby League folding. The club will take part in Championship 1 for their second season. The club will be also taking part again in the Challenge Cup, and the National League Cup (known as the Northern Rail Cup for sponsorship reasons) for the first time in their short history.

Pre-season

2013 Table

2013 Championship 1 Fixtures and Results

2013 Northern Rail Cup Fixtures and Results

2013 Tetleys Challenge Cup Fixtures and Results

Stats 

For all stats,

Appearances

Points

Tries

Goals

2013 Squad

It was announced in October 2012 that Crusaders would be again holding open trials for the 2013 squad after very successful trials for the 2012 season.

Playing squad

2013 transfers

Gains

Loanees

Losses

References

North Wales Crusaders
2013 in rugby league by club
2013 in Welsh rugby league